Maruja Grifell (February 6, 1907 – March 27, 1968) was a Mexican film actress.

Selected filmography 
 Another Dawn (1943)
 The Lieutenant Nun (1944)
 Adultery (1945)
 Cantaclaro (1946)
 Everybody's Woman (1946)
 Music Inside (1947)
 The Lost Child (1947)
 Fly Away, Young Man! (1947)
 Adventure in the Night (1948)
 Music, Poetry and Madness (1948)
 A Family Like Many Others (1949)
 Confessions of a Taxi Driver (1949)
 The Great Madcap (1949)
 Philip of Jesus (1949)
 Immaculate (1950)
 Lost (1950)
 History of a Heart (1951)
 Acapulco (1952)
 Women Who Work (1953)
 You've Got Me By the Wing (1953)
 Seven Women (1953)
 Pablo and Carolina (1957)

References

Bibliography 
 Pilcher, Jeffrey M. Cantinflas and the Chaos of Mexican Modernity. Rowman & Littlefield, 2001.

External links 
 

1907 births
1969 deaths
Mexican film actresses
People from Mexico City